Fanouris Goundoulakis (born 13 July 1983) is a Greek former professional footballer who played as a midfielder. He now works as a scout for AEK Athens. He is one of the very few greek footballers who has a song dedicated to him.

Career
Goundoulakis started playing professional football in 2000–01 at Kalamata F.C.In January 2004 he was transferred to Panionios and immediately got the basic position in the first team squad. He was a key member of the team during seasons (2006–07 and 2007–08) when they finished fifth in the championship with coach Ewald Lienen and participated in UEFA Cup and Intertoto Cup. It may not have frequent contact with the nets, but was especially dear to a purple platform because of militancy. In 2007, in an away match of the UEFA Cup group, achieved an amazing goal on Helsingborgs (score: 1–1), which is still remembered by fans of the club. He spent 9 years with the club, before he signed with Platanias. On 26 April 2016, Platanias officially announced the extension of experienced attacking midfielder' contract until the end of next season.

Honours
Egaleo
Gamma Ethniki: 2018–19

References

External links
Profile at Onsports.gr

1983 births
Living people
Greek footballers
Footballers at the 2004 Summer Olympics
Olympic footballers of Greece
Super League Greece players
Panionios F.C. players
Kalamata F.C. players
Platanias F.C. players
Greece under-21 international footballers
AEK F.C. non-playing staff
Association football midfielders
People from Corinthia
Footballers from the Peloponnese